Ambroise is a given name and surname.  People with the name include:

Ambroise of Normandy
Ambroise (fl. c. 1190), a Norman poet and chronicler of the Third Crusade.

Given name
 Ambroise, Lord of Monaco, ruled 1419–1427
 Ambroise Abdo (1820–1876), Syrian Melkite Greek Catholic bishop
 Ambroise Begue (born 1995), French footballer
 Ambroise Boimbo (died 1989), Congolese citizen who snatched the sword of King Baudouin I of Belgium in 1960
 Ambroise Chevreux (1728–1792), French Benedictine
 Ambroise Croizat (1901–1951), French syndicalist and communist politician
 Ambroise Dubois (1542/3–1614/5), Flemish-born French painter
 Ambroise Dupont (born 1937), French politician 
 Ambroise Félicitet (born 1993), Martiniquais footballer
 Ambroise Garin (1875–1969), Italian-born French bicycle racer
 Ambroise Gboho (born 1994), Ivorian footballer
 Ambroise Guellec (born 1941), French politician
 Ambroise Janvier (1613–1682), French Benedictine and theologian
 Ambroise de Loré (1396–1446), French military commander, baron of Ivry in Normandy, and companion of Joan of Arc
 Ambroise Michel (born 1982), French actor, director, and writer
 Ambroise Ngoya (born 1964), Congolese footballer
 Ambroise Noumazalaye (1933–2007), Congolese politician; Prime Minister of Congo-Brazzaville 1966–1968
 Ambroise Ouédraogo (born 1948), Burkinabé Roman Catholic bishop in Niger
 Ambroise Oyongo (born 1991), Cameroonian footballer
 Ambroise Paré ( 1510–1590), French barber surgeon
 Ambroise Rendu (educator) (1778–1860), French educator and translator
 Ambroise Rendu (politician) (1874-1973), French politician
 Ambroise D. Richard (1850–1917), Canadian lawyer and political figure
 Ambroise Roux (1921–1999), French businessman and political advisor
 Ambroise Sarr (born 1950), Senegalese wrestler
 Ambroise Tardieu (1788–1841), French cartographer and engraver
 Ambroise Thomas (1811–1896), French composer
 Ambroise Uwiragiye (born 1980), Rwandan long distance runner
 Ambroise Verschaffelt (1825–1886), Belgian horticulturist 
 Ambroise Vollard (1866–1939), French art dealer
 Ambroise Wonkam, Cameroonian physician
 Ambroise Yxemerry (1917–2013), French Polynesian editor and journalist

Surname
 Gary Ambroise (born 1985), French footballer 
 Jackson Ambroise (born 1952), Haitian painter
 Magloire Ambroise (1774–1807), hero of the Haitian Independence
 Yvon Ambroise (born 1942), Indian Roman Catholic bishop emeritus of Tuticorin

See also

 Saint-Ambroise (disambiguation)
 Ambrose (disambiguation)
 Ambrosia (disambiguation)
 Ambrosius (disambiguation)